Chris York (born 27 December 1989 in Epsom) is a rugby union free agent. He is currently turning out as an inspirational Number 8 for Wimbledon RFC.

He was discovered by Quins through the EPDG system, and was offered a full Academy contract in 2007. He has since worn the Quins shirt on numerous occasions, making his A league debut against Bristol last season, and his full XV debut in the pre-season friendly against Connacht Rugby in August 2008. He spent the 2008–09 season on loan at Blackheath F.C.

York's current position is no. 8, he can also play at flanker.

York represented the England Under 20 team at the 2009 IRB Junior World Championship.

On 4 June 2013, York signed for Newcastle Falcons in the Aviva Premiership from the 2013–14 season.

References

External links

England profile

1989 births
Living people
Blackheath F.C. players
English rugby union players
Esher RFC players
Harlequin F.C. players
People educated at Epsom College
Rugby union players from Epsom
Rugby union number eights
Rugby union flankers